Sumerian literature constitutes the earliest known corpus of recorded literature, including the religious writings and other traditional stories maintained by the Sumerian civilization and largely preserved by the later Akkadian and Babylonian empires. These records were written in the Sumerian language in the 18th and 17th Centuries BC during the Middle Bronze Age.

The Sumerians invented one of the first writing systems, developing Sumerian cuneiform writing out of earlier proto-writing systems by about the 30th century BC. 
The Sumerian language remained in official and literary use in the Akkadian and Babylonian empires, even after the spoken language disappeared from the population; literacy was widespread, and the Sumerian texts that students copied heavily influenced later Babylonian literature.

Poetry 
Most Sumerian literature is written in left-justified lines, and could contain line-based organization such as the couplet or the stanza, but the Sumerian definition of poetry is unknown.  It is not rhymed, although “comparable effects were sometimes exploited.”  It did not use syllabo-tonic versification, and the writing system precludes detection of rhythm, metre, rhyme, or alliteration.  Quantitative analysis of other possible poetic features seems to be lacking, or has been intentionally hidden by the scribes who recorded the writing.

Literary genres and topics 
Types of literature were not clearly defined, and all Sumerian literature incorporated poetic aspects. Sumerian poems demonstrate basic elements of poetry, including lines, imagery, and metaphor. Humans, gods, talking animals, and inanimate objects were all incorporated as characters. Suspense and humor were both incorporated into Sumerian stories. These stories were primarily shared orally, though they were also recorded by scribes. Some works were associated with specific musical instruments or contexts and may have been performed in specific settings. Sumerian literature did not use titles, instead being referred to by the work's first line.

Based on the categorization work of Miguel Civil, Modern assyriologists have divided the extant corpus of sumerian literature into broad categories including "Literary Catalogs", "Narratives and Mythological Compositions", "Historical Compositions and Praise Poetry", "Letters, Letter Prayers and Laws", "Hymns and Songs", "Heterogenous Compositions" (including Wisdom literature), and "Proverbs".

Literary catalogs 
Sumerian scribal education focused on a curriculum called the Decad. Manuscripts of these ten texts are some of the best preserved Sumerian literature.

Narrative and mythological compositions 
 Narratives featuring heroes include:
 Stories from the Epic of Gilgamesh, such as Gilgamesh and Huwawa, Gilgamesh and the Bull of Heaven, Gilgamesh and Aga, Gilgamesh, Enkidu and the Netherworld, and The Death of Gilgamesh.
Enmerkar and Lugalbanda: Enmerkar and the Lord of Aratta and Enmerkar and En-suhgir-ana as well as two tales of Lugalbanda during Enmerkar's campaign against Aratta:'Lugalbanda in the Mountain Cave and Lugalbanda and the Anzud BirdInanna's Descent to the Underworld, The Legend of Adapa Narratives featuring deities, such as Enki, Enlil (including Enlil and Ninlil), Inanna, Inanna and Dumuzid, and Ninurta (including Lugal-e and Angim)
 Other myths such as the Sumerian creation myth

 Historical compositions 
Praise Poems for kings
Third Dynasty of Ur - Ur-Nammu, Shulgi (including the Self-praise of Shulgi (Shulgi D), Amar-Sin, Shu-Sin, Ibbi-Sin
Isin dynasty - Ishbi-Erra, Shu-Ilishu, Iddin-Dagan, Ishme-Dagan, Lipit-Ishtar, Ur-Ninurta, Bur-Suen, Enlil-bani
Larsa dynasty - Gungunum, Sin-Iddinam, Sin-Iqisham, Warad-Sin, Rim-Sin
First Dynasty of Babylon - Hammurabi, Samsu-iluna, Abi-Eshuh
City Laments such as Lament for Ur and Lament for Sumer and Ur
King lists and other historical compositions such as Building of Ningirsu's temple

 Letters and laws 
Letters include the Correspondence of the Kings of Ur as well as Isin, Larsa, and other dynasties.
The Code of Ur-Nammu is attributed to Ur-Nammu, founder of the Third Dynasty of Ur
Code of Lipit-Ishtar
Code of Hammurabi

 Hymns 
 Hymns to deities in the Sumerian pantheon, such as the Hymn to Enlil, as well as Hymns dedicated to specific temples, including The Sumerian Temple Hymns collection and the Kesh Temple Hymn Heterogeneous compositions 
 Sumerian disputations - Song of the hoe, Debate between Bird and Fish, Debate between sheep and grain, Debate between Winter and Summer Instruction literature such as Instructions of Shuruppak Dialogue between a Man and His God

 Proverbs 
Anthologies of proverbs from Nippur, Susa, Urim, and Uruk

See also

 Akkadian literature
 Ancient Egyptian literature
 Cuneiform law
 Electronic Text Corpus of Sumerian Literature

 References 

 Further reading 
 
 
 
 
Shin Shifra (2008). Words as Magic and the Magic in Words''. Tel Aviv, Tel Aviv, The Israeli Ministry of Defence Press (in Hebrew). These are transcriptions of Shifra's discourses on literature of the Ancient Near East, first broadcast as a "University on the Air" course on the Israeli Army Radio.

External links 

The Electronic Text Corpus of Sumerian Literature
Catalogue of literary works at the Electronic Text Corpus of Sumerian Literature